Marcy South is a 2 circuit high voltage power line in the U.S. State of New York. Each circuit is 345,000 volts, the one circuit runs from Fraser Substation in Delaware County to Marcy Substation in Oneida County and the other circuit runs from Coopers Corners Substation to the Marcy Substation. It was constructed amid heavy controversy in the late 1980s by the New York Power Authority.

History 
The Power Authority of the State of New York announced plans to deliver hydroelectric power from Canada to the New York City region in 1982.

It became fully operational on June 1, 1988.

Controversy 
The power line met with vigorous and sometimes highly contentious and violent opposition from local property owners from its proposition to its planning and surveying, and even its construction.

Power grid improvement
The Marcy South Series Compensation Project began in 2016 and involved the installation of three series capacitor banks. The capacitor banks were installed to raise the voltage and keep it constant, which enhances transmission efficiency. Two capacitor banks were installed by New York Power Authority, the other installed by NYSEG at the Fraser Substation.

Future plans 
Since its construction, other projects including a high-voltage DC line have been proposed for the same route.

References 

New York City infrastructure